Rudibert Kunz (born 1943) is a German investigator, journalist and television editor.

Kunz is known for being the first journalist to write about the use Chemical weapons in the Rif War. Since 1979, he has been researching the history of weapons of mass destruction. He also wrote about the strategy of Saddam Hussein in the Gulf War 1991 and about the role of the ABC weapons of Adolf Hitler.

He is a holder of a Master in literature and sociology.

Bibliography

References
 Völkermord und Kriegsverbrechen in der ersten Hälfte des 20. Jahrhunderts – 

1943 births
German investigative journalists
Rif War
Living people
German male non-fiction writers
20th-century German journalists
21st-century German journalists